Alfonso Rolando Izquierdo Bustamante (14 October 1953 – 8 December 2011) was a Mexican politician from the Institutional Revolutionary Party. From 2006 to 2009 he served as Deputy of the LX Legislature of the Mexican Congress representing Tabasco.

References

1953 births
2011 deaths
Politicians from Mexico City
Institutional Revolutionary Party politicians
21st-century Mexican politicians
Deputies of the LX Legislature of Mexico
Members of the Chamber of Deputies (Mexico) for Tabasco